Zivah, Ziva,  or Zhiva, is originally a Hebrew name. Ziva is a first name for women and an equally uncommon last name. The meaning of the name Ziva, which is a variant of Ziv, is “radiance, brilliance, light, brightness, light of God”. Its pronunciation sounds like "Zeevah".

References 

Hebrew feminine given names